Ruben Reus (born 5 October 1984 in Alkmaar) is a Dutch figure skater. He is the 2005 Dutch national champion. He placed 25th at the 2004 World Junior Figure Skating Championships. He has since turned professional. In 2006, he participated in Dancing on Ice.

Results

External links
 

Dutch male single skaters
1984 births
Living people
Sportspeople from Alkmaar
21st-century Dutch people